Stanley Richardson, known professionally as Stan Richards (8 December 1930 – 11 February 2005), was an English television actor, best known for his portrayal of Seth Armstrong in the ITV soap opera Emmerdale.

Career
He played the role of Seth Armstrong from May 1978 until his death of emphysema in 2005, having been originally "signed" to the series for a run of just 4 weeks.  He had previously acted in six episodes of Coronation Street as Arthur Stokes, having started his career aged 15 as a pub pianist.

Upon his death, his life and work were honoured at the British Soap Awards in 2005.

Filmography

References

External links

 
 

1930 births
2005 deaths
Deaths from emphysema
Actors from Barnsley
English male television actors